Hideya (written: 秀弥, 秀哉 or 英也) is a masculine Japanese given name. Notable people with the name include:

Hideya Kawahara, computer programmer and developer of Project Looking Glass
Hideya Matsumoto, Japanese mathematician
, Japanese footballer
Hideya Suzuki, Japanese musician and member of Mr. Children
, Japanese footballer
, Japanese actor and model

See also
Hideya Station, a railway station in Aga, Higashikanbara District, Niigata Prefecture, Japan

Japanese masculine given names